The traditional music of the Ndebele is characterised mainly by the widespread use of choral song accompanied by leg rattles (amahlwayi), clappers (izikeyi) and clapping of hands. Compared with choral song, solo singing and purely instrumental music are of minor importance. Like the Shona, the Ndebele also use mouthbows (umqangala) and gourd-bows (icaco), played mostly for self-amusement.

Ndebele musicians
There are many Ndebele songwriters and bands, mainly Zimbabwean artists, who have been heavily influenced by the Ndebele story telling ways.

Albert Nyathi
Afrida Band
Andy Brown & The Storm
Ilanga
Kampi Moto & George Phiri
Louis Mhlanga
Marsha Moyo
Thabani Band
Ziyaduma
Sandra Ndebele

One of the described Queens of Ndebele music is Nothembi Mkhwebane, who became an international star with her band The Siblings.

Most Ndebele musicians are merited for outstanding accomplishments in the music industry by Bulawayo Arts Awards.

References

Zimbabwean music